"Searchlight" is a very short science fiction story by American writer Robert A. Heinlein, about a little blind girl whose spaceship crashes on the Moon. The search for her takes advantage of her prodigious musical ability to locate her.

It was originally written in 1962 as part of an advertisement for Hoffman Electronics.  Heinlein says that because it was so short it was much harder to write than writing novels.  Perhaps because of this, it was the last short story Heinlein wrote; the remaining quarter-century of his career was devoted to writing novels and non-fiction essays.

"Searchlight" is anthologized in The Worlds of Robert A. Heinlein, a collection of short stories published in 1966 and his Expanded Universe in 1980.

Short stories by Robert A. Heinlein
1962 short stories
Science fiction short stories
Short stories set on the Moon